Psilopsiagon is a genus of parrot in the family Psittacidae. It contains the following species:

References

 
Psittacidae
Bird genera
Taxa named by Robert Ridgway
Taxonomy articles created by Polbot